SVIMS - Sri Padmavathi Medical College for Women is a medical college dedicated for women in Tirupati, Andhra Pradesh, India. This college is managed by Sri Venkateswara Institute of Medical Sciences (SVIMS) University. The college was established in the year 2014. It has 150 seats.

See also
Sri Venkateswara Institute of Medical Sciences

References

Women's universities and colleges in Andhra Pradesh
Medical colleges in Andhra Pradesh
Universities and colleges in Tirupati
Educational institutions established in 2014
2014 establishments in Andhra Pradesh